Riddells Creek  is a town in Victoria, Australia, located in Wurundjeri Country and the Shire of Macedon Ranges. It is located in between the cities of Bendigo and Melbourne. Riddells Creek is also the name of the main watercourse which flows through the township, and which is a tributary of Jacksons Creek to the south. The town is served by Riddells Creek railway station on the Bendigo line.

History
Riddells Creek falls in the traditional lands of the Wurundjeri people of the Kulin nation. The dirt road running parallel and opposite to the train station, Hamilton Street, was home to Mr John Carre Riddell whose house now demolished was also the oldest house in Riddells Creek to date. Hamilton Street and the Road between New Gisborne and Riddells Creek is named Hamilton Road after Thomas Hamilton.

Riddells Creek Post Office opened on 1 February 1859.

Environment and facilities
Riddells Creek is on the southern foothills of the Macedon Ranges. Riddells Creek is home to two historic railway bridges and is surrounded by natural bushland. There is also a small creek that runs through the town at Wybejong Park.

Riddells Creek Primary School provides education for children in the area. Sporting and clubs in Riddells Creek include a Pony Club, Riddells Junior Basketball Association, Riddell Football Club, Cricket Club and Dog Obedience Club. There is also a Living and Learning Centre, the Riddells Creek Winery and Riddells Creek Landcare.

Riddells Creek is home to the Dromkeen Museum, a nineteenth century homestead classified by the National Trust of Australia that is home to the Australian Children's Literature Collection.  It also provides educational displays and programs relating to Australian children's literature.

To the east of Riddells Creek, adjacent to the Mount Charlie State Forest, the  Rowallan Recreation and Adventure Camp is owned by the Scouts and Guides of Essendon Area. It is named after Lord Rowallan and opened in 1950.

Riddells Creek also has a Railway Station served by trains on the Bendigo Line. Sometimes trains run express not stopping at many stations including Riddells Creek.

Gallery

References

External links

Towns in Victoria (Australia)
Shire of Macedon Ranges
1859 establishments in Australia